The American way is a term for the way of life in the United States.

American Way may also refer to:

 American Way (magazine), a magazine printed for American Airlines and American Eagle
 American Way (play), a 2004 play by Jeremy Gable
Amway, multi-level marketing company

The American Way may also refer to:
 The American System (economic plan), originally called "The American Way"
 The American Way (comics), 2006 comic book series
 The American Way (album), a 1990 album by Sacred Reich
 The American Way (play), a 1939 play by George S. Kaufman and Moss Hart
 The American Way (film), a 1986 American science fiction comedy film
 The American Way (novel), a novel by Paddy Kelly

See also
People for the American Way, an advocacy organization in the US